Héctor Samuel Rodríguez Sánchez (born 17 February 1942) is a Mexican politician affiliated with the Institutional Revolutionary Party. He served as Deputy of the LIX Legislature of the Mexican Congress representing Sinaloa as replacement of Antonio Astiazarán, and then served as municipal president of Empalme, Sonora from 2006 to 2009.

References

1942 births
Living people
Politicians from Sinaloa
Institutional Revolutionary Party politicians
Municipal presidents in Sonora
Deputies of the LIX Legislature of Mexico
Members of the Chamber of Deputies (Mexico) for Sinaloa